Devapur, is a census town in Adilabad district of the Indian state of Telangana.

References 

Census towns in Adilabad district
Mandal headquarters in Adilabad district